Lachnostachys eriobotrya  (common name - Lambswool) is a plant in the Lamiaceae family, native to Western Australia.

It was first described by Ferdinand von Mueller in 1859 as Walcottia eriobotrya', 
but was transferred to the genus Lachnostachys''  in 1917 by George Claridge Druce.

References

External links 

 Lachnostachys eriobotrya occurrence data from the Australasian Virtual Herbarium

Taxa named by Ferdinand von Mueller
Plants described in 1859
eriobotrya